Pour may refer to these people:

 Kour Pour (born 1987), British artist of part-Iranian descent
 Mehdi Niyayesh Pour (born 1992), Iranian footballer
 Mojtaba Mobini Pour (born 1991), Iranian footballer
 Pouya Jalili Pour (born 1976), Iranian singer residing in the United States
 Pour Lui (born Puu Rui, 1990), Japanese singer

See also
 
 
 Decantation, a method of pouring that can be used to remove sediment
 Pur, Iran, a village in Hormozgan Province, Iran
 Mohammad Pour Rahmatollah (born 1995), Iranian footballer
 Rahim Pour-Azghandi, (born 1964/65), Iranian scholar and politician
 Sirous Pour Mousavi (born 1971), Iranian football coach
 Mohammad-Reza Pour-Mohammadi (born 1958), President of Tabriz University, Iran
 Mostafa Pour-Mohammadi (born 1960), Iranian prosecutor and politician
 Pour Lui (disambiguation)
 Pour Me (disambiguation)